The Climate Registry (TCR) is a non-profit organization governed by U.S. states and Canadian provinces and territories.  TCR designs and operates voluntary and compliance greenhouse gas (GHG) reporting programs globally, and assists organizations in measuring, reporting and verifying the carbon in their operations in order to manage and reduce it. TCR also consults with governments nationally and internationally on all aspects of GHG measurement, reporting, and verification.

History 
Established in 2007, The Climate Registry was formed to continue the work of the California Climate Action Registry (CCAR). Created by the State of California in 2001, CCAR promoted and protected businesses’ early actions to manage and reduce their greenhouse gas (GHG) emissions. Through the state mandate, CCAR established protocols to guide emissions inventories and manage an online reporting tool, the Climate Action Registry Reporting Tool (CARROT), to serve as a central database for emissions reports.  Members of CCAR served as true leaders in environmental responsibility and were among the first in the world to measure their emissions according to comprehensive and rigorous standards and make their emissions publicly accessible online. Together, CCAR and its members influenced California climate change policy, including Assembly Bill 32 (AB 32), and worked to ensure proper recognition from the state for early actions to reduce emissions.  Recognizing climate change is a global issue and that success in emissions reporting must be based on consistent data in an integrated system that stretched beyond California’s borders, CCAR was instrumental in establishing TCR with the mission of expanding CCAR’s emissions reporting work to include all of North America.  CCAR accepted its last emission inventory reports for 2009 in December 2010 and officially transitioned its members to The Climate Registry.  CCAR is now a program of The Climate Registry’s sister organization, the Climate Action Reserve.

Participants
At the launch of The Climate Registry, the following were the participants:

US States:

  Arizona
  California
  Colorado
  Connecticut 
  Delaware 
  Florida 
  Hawaii 
  Illinois 
  Kansas 
  Maine 
  Maryland
  Massachusetts 
  Michigan 
  Minnesota 
  Missouri 
  Montana 
  New Hampshire 
  New Jersey 
  New Mexico 
  New York 
  North Carolina 
  Ohio 
  Oregon 
  Pennsylvania 
  Rhode Island 
  South Carolina
  Utah 
  Vermont 
  Washington 
  Wisconsin 
  Wyoming

Canadian provinces:

  British Columbia
  Manitoba
  Ontario
  Newfoundland and Labrador

As of September 24, 2009 all Canadian Provinces and Territories are participating in the greenhouse gas registry.

  Yukon
  Northwest Territories
  Nunavut
  British Columbia
  Alberta
  Saskatchewan
  Manitoba
  Ontario
  Quebec
  Newfoundland and Labrador
  Prince Edward Island
  New Brunswick
  Nova Scotia

Native American tribes:
Campo Kumeyaay Nation

See also

Emissions & Generation Resource Integrated Database
Emissions trading
Energy policy of the United States
Energy use in the United States
Global warming
Greenhouse gas emissions in the USA 
Greenhouse gas inventory
Kyoto Protocol
Midwestern Greenhouse Gas Reduction Accord
Project Vulcan
Regional Greenhouse Gas Initiative
Western Regional Climate Action Initiative

References

External links
The Climate Registry - official site
COMET-VR - Measurement and Monitoring
Project Vulcan

Climate change in the United States
American environmental websites
Greenhouse gas emissions in the United States
Organizations established in 2007
Carbon finance